WMKY (90.3 FM) is a National Public Radio-affiliated station in Morehead, Kentucky. It primarily features National Public Radio programming. Its coverage area extends from the Lexington metropolitan area in the west to the Huntington-Ashland metropolitan area in the east and from southern Ohio in the north to Hazard, Kentucky in the south.

External links
 WMKY official website
 

NPR member stations
MKY
Morehead State University
College radio stations in Kentucky